Karamea Centennial Museum is a museum in Karamea on the West Coast of the South Island of New Zealand.

History 
The museum was opened in 1974, for the centennial celebrations of the settlement.

Collection 
The museum collection includes photographs and exhibits on the local industries of sawmilling, dairying, gold mining, flax milling and shipping. It also contains district archives, material from local schools and family history material. The museum is run by the Karamea Historical Society Incorporated and staffed by local volunteers.

References 

History museums in New Zealand
Buller District